Miloš Srejović (Serbian Cyrillic: Милош Срејовић; born April 12, 1956) is a former Serbian track and field athlete who competed in the triple jump for Yugoslavia. He won a gold medal at the 1978 European Championships in the event. His coach was Vladimir "Vlada" Luković, Milan Spasojević and Aleksandar Marinković. He was a member and performed for AK Radnički Kragujevac.

His personal best of 17.01 metres is the Serbian national record for the triple jump.

References
IAAF Profile
The sports.org Profile
Bivši atletski prvaci traže promene, B92

External links
 
 

1956 births
Living people
Serbian male triple jumpers
Yugoslav male triple jumpers
European Athletics Championships medalists
Mediterranean Games silver medalists for Yugoslavia
Athletes (track and field) at the 1979 Mediterranean Games
Mediterranean Games medalists in athletics